Gilbertville is a community in the town of Canton in Oxford County, Maine, about  northwest of the city of Augusta.

Unincorporated communities in Maine
Unincorporated communities in Oxford County, Maine